nHydrate is an object-relational mapping (ORM) solution for the Microsoft .NET platform providing a framework for a relational database to be mapped to .NET objects. It is designed to alleviate the drudgery software developers experience writing persistence domains.

nHydrate is free as an open source project on GitHub.com under the MIT License.

nHydrate was originally created in 2003 as a private project to solve the issues with the .NET Framework 1.1. Using ADO.Net Datasets is cumbersome and error prone, so a small generated framework was created to relieve developers of the CRUD work. As a private project it was later inspired by the work of the NHibernate group.

nHydrate was a private project from 2003 until 2009. It was used at various companies in the Atlanta, Georgia, area but never widely released. It was publicly released on September 10, 2009.

nHydrate is built on the .NET Framework 4.0.

From version 5.0 and above, the entire framework has been reworked to use only Entity Framework as it internal data access layer. The modeler is now visual with a main diagram like other modeling products. All code interactions are simply Entity Framework now so there is no learning curve for developers when using the generated output.

Feature summary
nHydrate's primary feature is mapping .NET objects to an SQL server database. The CRUD layer (create, update, delete) is also implemented. There are numerous retrieval mechanism facilities. nHydrate generates the SQL for all CRUD operations as well as advanced LINQ capabilities. The product is not database portable. The framework is designed to work exclusively with Microsoft SQL Server. There is an internal project to use MySql but this is not yet a public release.

The tool is entirely sited within Visual Studio.NET and all model maintenance and generation is handled directly from the environment. There are no XML files or other complex configuration scenarios to navigate like almost all other ORM tools. The VS.NET plugin GUI editor provides an interface to interact with a visual model and edit a model.

History
nHydrate was started by Michael Knight, and later added Chris Davis. By 2006, the platform had much of its current functionality, minus LINQ, and was being used in applications in the Atlanta area. By 2009, the advanced functionality had been added like inheritance, LINQ, and VS.NET integration.

External links
Archived NHydrate Home Page
NHydrate Project Home on GitHub.com
NHydrate Overview

Microsoft software